Home ~ My Song Diary is a compilation album by Priscilla Ahn. It was released in Japan on October 31, 2012.

Track listing

References

Priscilla Ahn albums
2012 albums